Tanti is a Hindu caste. It may also refer to:

People 
 Bhadreswar Tanti, Indian politician
 Frank Tanti (born 1949), Australian politician
 Gaetano Tanti, Maltese trade unionist
 Joe Tanti (born 1959), Maltese radio and TV presenter
 Peppino Tanti (born 1941), Italian weightlifter
 Tony Tanti (born 1963), Canadian ice hockey player
 Tulsi Tanti, Indian businessman

Places 
 Tanti, Córdoba, a town in Argentina
 Tanti Park railway station in Australia